Barry Atkinson (14 December 1937 – 13 December 2021) was an English-born Australian professional darts player. Nicknamed Bazza, he competed in events of the 1970s and 1980s.

Darts career
Atkinson played in the 1977 Winmau World Masters where he lost in the last 16 stage to Paul Reynolds who went on to reach the final and lose to Eric Bristow. He played in the inaugural BDO World Darts Championship in 1978, but lost in the first round 6–0 in legs to eventual champion Leighton Rees from Wales. He returned the next year, but again lost in the first round to Ceri Morgan from Wales in 1979.

Atkinson left the BDO in December 1988. He later released the book Getting to the Point, which would help the average darts player to improve their game through techniques, tactics and training.

World Championship results

BDO
 1978: Last 16: (lost to Leighton Rees 0–6) (legs)
 1979: Last 24: (lost to Ceri Morgan 1–2) (sets)

References

External links
 Profile and stats on Darts Database
 Profile and stats on Mastercaller

1937 births
2021 deaths
Australian darts players
British Darts Organisation players
Sportspeople from Adelaide